The 1996 Oklahoma State Cowboys football team represented the Oklahoma State University during the 1996 NCAA Division I-A football season. They participated as members of the Big 12 Conference in the South Division. They played their home games at Lewis Field in Stillwater, Oklahoma. They were coached by head coach Bob Simmons.

Schedule

Roster

References

Oklahoma State
Oklahoma State Cowboys football seasons
Oklahoma State Cowboys football